James Dandridge Halyburton (February 23, 1803 – January 26, 1879) was a United States district judge of the United States District Court for the Eastern District of Virginia.

Education and career

Born on February 23, 1803, in New Kent County, Virginia, Halyburton received an Artium Baccalaureus degree in 1823 from Harvard University and attended the University of Virginia School of Law. He entered private practice in New Kent County starting in 1824. He was a member of the Virginia House of Delegates. He was a commonwealth's attorney for New Kent County until 1844.

Federal judicial service

Halyburton was nominated by President John Tyler on June 15, 1844, to a seat on the United States District Court for the Eastern District of Virginia vacated by Judge John Y. Mason. He was confirmed by the United States Senate on June 15, 1844, and received his commission the same day. His service terminated on April 24, 1861, due to his resignation.

Later career and death

Following his resignation from the federal bench, Halyburton served as a Judge of the Confederate District Court for the Eastern District of Virginia from 1861 to 1865. He resumed private practice in Richmond, Virginia from 1865 to 1874. He was a Professor of law at the University of Richmond from 1867 to 1874. He died on January 26, 1879, in Richmond.

References

Sources
 
 W. H. Bryson, comp., Legal Education in Virginia (1982), pp. 273–276.

1803 births
1879 deaths
Harvard College alumni
Judges of the United States District Court for the Eastern District of Virginia
United States federal judges appointed by John Tyler
19th-century American judges
Judges of the Confederate States of America